Willy Enrique Meyer Pleite (born 19 August 1952, in Madrid) is a Spanish politician and Member of the European Parliament with the Izquierda Unida (United Left). He is a member of the bureau of the European United Left–Nordic Green Left, and sits on the European Parliament's Committee on Fisheries, Committee on Foreign Affairs, and the Committee on Petitions. He is a substitute for the Committee on Development.

Meyer Pleite was born in Madrid. He is a member of the Communist Party of Spain (PCE) since 1970.

His name caught the attention of the media after the resignation of his sit as Member of the European Parliament due to the discovery of a controversial SICAV under the ownership of the communist parliamentary in 2014.

Decorations
  Knight Grand Cross of the Aeronautical Order of Merit [with white distinctive] (Kingdom of Spain, 23 December 1999).

See also
2004 European Parliament election in Spain

References

External links

 
 

1952 births
Living people
Politicians from Madrid
Communist Party of Spain politicians
Members of the 6th Congress of Deputies (Spain)
Spanish people of German descent
United Left (Spain) MEPs
MEPs for Spain 2004–2009
MEPs for Spain 2009–2014